The Murex d'Or (also known as the Golden Murex award) is a Lebanese award created by two Lebanese physicians, Zahi and Fadi Helou to recognize achievements in the domain of art in Lebanon, the Arab region and the world. The first Murex d'Or ceremony took place on June 4, 2000. The name of the award is a tribute to Phoenician Murex sea snails, which were used to dye cloth in imperial Tyrian purple.

Awards by year and category
2000: The first Murex d'Or ceremony took place on June 4, 2000 under the patronage of minister Suleiman Trabulsy at the Regency Palace Hotrel's Caesar's Palace theater in Adma.
2001: The 2001 Murex d'Or event took place on June 2, 2001 under the patronage of Information minister Ghazi Aridi at the Caesar's Palace theater in Adma.
2002: The event took place on September 14, 2002 under the patronage of the First Lady  Andree Lahoud also at the Caesar's Palace theater in Adma.
2003: The fourth installment of the awards was held  on November 29, 2003 at the Casino du Liban's Salle des Ambassadeurs.
2004: This ceremony took place on January 29, 2005 under the patronage  of President  Emile Lahoud at the Caesar's Palace theater in Adma.
2005: This installment was held on January 28, 2006 at the Casino du Liban's Salle des Ambassadeurs.
2006: The seventh Murex d'Or ceremony took place in the Salle des Ambassadeurs on May 5, 2007.
2007: The event was held also at the Salle des Ambassadeurs on June 20, 2008.
2008: The event was held at the same place on June 19, 2009.
2009: The event was held at the "Eddé Sands Resort" in Byblos on June 10, 2010 and screened live on MTV Lebanon.
Gaby Lteif received a Golden Murex for his entire career.
2010: The Golden Murex were organized at the Edde Sands Resort in Byblos on 10 June 2010 and broadcast live on MTV Lebanon.
2011: The Golden Murex took place on June 23, 2011.
Best Arabic Actress: Sulafa Memar
Best Arabic actor: Kosai Khauli

2012: The ceremony took place on June 11, 2012 and was broadcast on MTV Lebanon.
Best Lebanese artist: Nawal Al Zoghbi.
Best Arabic Actress: Poussi
Best Arabic actor: Maxim Khalil
The best Lebanese song: "Ya Leil Ana Bhebbal" (Sarah El Hani), "Ya Lalali" (Nadine Saab), "Akher Hammak" (Sabine), "Ya Kell El Deni" (Joseph Attieh), "W Taamar Lebnan" (Hicham El Hajj)
Best lyrics and music: Joseph and Michel Geha
Best play: "Che Guevara" by Farid and Maher Al Sabbagh
Best Arabic song: "Eed Habaybak" (Saber Rebaï), "Maarafch Leih" (Nawal Al Zoghbi), "Men Ouyouni" (Myriam Fares), "Al Ghira" (Naya), "Byehssedouni" (George Wassouf)
Best Arabic Artist: Saber Rebaï
Best star: Myriam Fares
Best screenplay: Claudia Marchelian
Best artist: Ziad Bourji
Best Lebanese film: Where Do We Go Now?
Best film music: Khaled Mouzannar
Best Lebanese actress: Nadine Nassib Njeim
Best Arabic Actress: Hend Sabry
Best Lebanese series: "Al Chahroura"
Best Actress: Carole Samaha
Best Arabic Singer: Assi El Helani
Best Arabic Singer: Sherine
Best Model: Mona Ghoss
Best actress in a secondary role: Joelle Dagher
Best actor in a secondary role: Majdi Machmouchi
Best Song: "Majnoun" by Ramy Ayach
Best music: Mike Massy
Best album: "Kol D'i'a Chakhssiye" by Wael Jassar
Best young actress: Dorra Zarrouk
Best young talent: Sabine
Best young talent: Anwar Nour
Best Lebanese director: Samir Habchi
Best young singer: Naji El Osta
Best young actress: Dalida Khalil
Best Video: Angie Jamal
Best Lebanese actor: Youssef El Khal
Best young talent of the Gulf: Mansour Zayed
2013: The ceremony took place on June 24, 2013 and was broadcast on MTV Lebanon.
Singer Khaled received a Golden Murex.
2014: The Golden Murex of 2014 took place at the Casino of Lebanon on Thursday, September 3, 2014.
2015: The Golden Murex took place at the Casino du Liban in Jounieh, Lebanon.
Singer Saad Lamjarred won a golden Murex for his hit song "Enty".
Aline Lahoud: Best Singer and Actress Award for her role in the play (Bent Al Jabal)
2016: Les Murex d'or took place on May 28, 2016 and was broadcast on LBC and Future TV.
Singer Hatim Idar received the Murex d'or award in the best Arab artist category.
Singer Sheila received an Achievement Award for her Achievement Award.
2017: The Golden Murex took place on May 12, 2017 and was broadcast on MTV.
Singer Saad Lamjarred received the Best Song Award for his song Ghaltana and the Prize of the general public.

References

Lebanese awards